Skarnsund or Skarnsundet is a strait in the Trondheimsfjord in Trøndelag county, Norway. The strait connects the Beitstadfjorden with the outer section of the Trondheimsfjorden. On the northeastern side of the strait is the village of Vangshylla and on the southwestern side is the villages of Venneshamn and Kjerringvik (this side is the Mosvik area of Inderøy). The strait has a strong tidal current with a maelstrom.

The Skarnsund strait was crossed by the Vangshylla–Kjerringvik Ferry (car ferry), operated by Innherredsferja, prior to 19 December 1991. The bridge is part of Norwegian County Road 755. Skarnsund is a noted site for both sports fishing and underwater diving.

References

Landforms of Trøndelag
Trondheimsfjord
Inderøy
Straits of Norway